Ashok Gadgil (born November 15, 1950 in Mumbai, India) Is the Andrew and Virginia Rudd Family Foundation Distinguished Chair and Professor of Safe Water and Sanitation at the University of California, Berkeley.  He is a Faculty Senior Scientist and has served as director of the Energy and Environmental Technologies Division at Lawrence Berkeley National Laboratory.

Gadgil specializes in heat transfer, fluid dynamics, and technology design for development. He has substantial experience in technical, economic, and policy research on energy efficiency and its implementation - particularly in developing countries. 
Three of his best-known technologies for the developing-world are "UV Waterworks" (a simple, effective, and inexpensive disinfection system for drinking water), the "Berkeley-Darfur Stove" (a low-cost sheet-metal stove that saves fuelwood in internally displaced person's camps in Darfur), and ECAR (ElectroChemical Arsenic Removal) for removing arsenic from water.  Gadgil advocates for immediate and strategic action on the part of the research community to apply current scientific knowledge to address world-wide issues relating to climate change.

Education
Gadgil holds a physics degree from the University of Mumbai, an M.Sc. in physics from Indian Institute of Technology Kanpur, and an M.Sc. (1975) and Ph.D. (1979) in physics from the University of California, Berkeley. After completing his Ph.D. he spent 5 years working for a non-profit in India before returning to Berkeley.

Career
Gadgil Is the Andrew and Virginia Rudd Family Foundation Distinguished Chair and Professor of Safe Water and Sanitation at the University of California, Berkeley. He also has been distinguished professor of civil and environmental engineering at the University of California, Berkeley.  At Lawrence Berkeley National Laboratory (LBNL) Gadgil is a faculty senior scientist, and former director of the Environmental Energy Technologies Division (2009–2015). From 2012 to 2022, Gadgil was the faculty director of the Development Impact Lab at UC Berkeley. He has taught graduate courses at UC Berkeley since 2006 addressing topics such as “Design for Sustainable Communities,” and “Technology and Sustainability”. 

Gadgil has served as editor of the journal Annual Review of Environment and Resources since 2009.
Gadgil and Paul Gertler were the founding editors of the Open Access journal Development Engineering, first published by Elsevier in 2016.

In 1998 and again in 2006, Gadgil was invited by the Smithsonian Institution's Lemelson Center for the Study of Invention and Innovation to speak at the National Museum of American History about his life and work.

In September 2022, Springer published an Open Access graduate-level textbook Co-Edited by Gadgil, Introduction to Development Engineering: A Framework with Applications from the Field, freely downloadable from the Springer website.

Research

Gadgil led a group of about 20 researchers at LBNL conducting experimental and modeling research in indoor airflow and pollutant transport. Most of that work was focused on reducing indoor radon concentrations in individual houses, and protecting office-building occupants from the threat of chemical and biological attacks. 

In early 1990s, he analyzed the potential for large utility-sponsored projects to promote energy efficient electric lighting in poor households in developing countries, then teamed up with others to design and demonstrate such projects.  These have become commonplace in dozens of developing countries since 2000 onward, saving billions of dollars annually to their economies.

In recent years, he has worked on ways to inexpensively remove arsenic from groundwater used for drinking, and clean-burning biomass stoves, including design, production, and dissemination of the improved cookstoves for Darfur (Sudan) refugees. Reducing the amount of fuel needed has helped to protect women from assault, for which they are at risk while foraging for fuel.

Gadgil has authored or co-authored at least 213 papers which are cited at least 3,805 times. He was elected a member of the National Academy of Engineering in 2013 for engineering solutions to the problems of potable water and energy in developing countries.

UV Waterworks

UV Waterworks uses the UV light emitted by a low-pressure mercury discharge (similar to that in a fluorescent lamp) to disinfect drinking water. Effective disinfection at affordable cost is the primary and most important feature of UV Waterworks—allowing an entire system (including costs of pumps, filters, tanks, housing-structure, consumables, and employee salaries for operation) to sell drinking water at about 2 cents US for 12 liters even in deep rural areas, where personal incomes are commonly less than $1 US per day.

This business model, developed and implemented by WaterHealth International, makes safe drinking water affordable and accessible to even poor communities in developing countries.   it provided safe drinking water for 26-29 million people in India and Africa. For UV Waterworks,  Gadgil received the Discover Award in 1996 for the most significant environmental invention of the year, as well as the Popular Science Award for "Best of What is New - 1996".

Darfur Stoves Project

The Darfur Stoves Project seeks to protect Darfuri women by providing them with specially developed stoves which require less firewood, hence decreasing women’s exposure to violence while collecting firewood and their need to trade food rations for fuel. The stoves were developed with input from the women who would use them, enabling the designers to ensure that they would not tip over and that they would cook at an appropriate heat.

The Darfur Stoves Project is the first initiative of the nonprofit organization, Potential Energy.  Gadgil is a co-Founder and served as Board Chair of Potential Energy till 2015. Potential Energy's mission is to adapt and scale technologies that improve lives in developing countries.  The Darfur Stoves Project collaborates with international organizations such as Oxfam America and the Sudanese organization, Sustainable Action Group (SAG).  As of 2018, Potential Energy had distributed over 40,000 stoves to women in Darfur, Sudan. A single stove can last more than five years, saving 15-30% of a family's fuel costs, and reducing greenhouse gas emissions by two metric tons per year.

ECAR 
{{external media | width = 210px | align = right | headerimage=  | video1 = “ElectroChemical Arsenic Remediation (ECAR)”, January 9, 2017. |video2= Electrochemical Arsenic Remediation by Gadgil Lab for Energy and Water Research,
April 9, 2014}}

ECAR (ElectroChemical Arsenic Removal)  is a simple technology for removing arsenic from drinking water with a low-voltage electric current and iron electrodes. ECAR purifies water above WHO standards at a cost of about 0.08 cents per liter, and was tested in the field in West Bengal in 2012. In 2013, it was licensed by an Indian water company for further development.

Documentaries
Ashok Gadgil is featured in Irena Salina's feature documentary Flow: For Love of Water (2008) and Michael Apted's award-winning 1999 documentary Me and Isaac Newton.

Awards (Selected List)
2022, Director's Award from Berkeley Lab for Social Impact. For "design of the “DreamWarmer,” an innovative, non-electric infant warmer that uniquely addresses the challenges of resource-limited settings and has been proven to reduce ’all-cause’ infant mortality by a factor of three. "
2022, Inaugural Laureate of the Zuckerberg Water Prize for "outstanding leadership, vision, innovation, and lasting global impact in the field of Water."
2020, Honorable Mention, Patents for Humanity, United States Patent and Trademark Office, with Vi Rapp,  for inventing an infant-warming device that uses a phase-change material to indicate temperature.
2017, Curry Stone Design Prize.  Inducted in the "Social Design Honoree Circle" of honorees of the Curry Stone Foundation, for design under resource scarcity.
2016, R&D100 Award, R&D Magazine, for Sustainable and Affordable Fluoride Removal (SAFR) treatment of groundwater. The R&D100 Awards, called the “Oscars of Industrial Innovation”, are an international annual competition and celebrate the 100 top technology advances of the past year.
2015, Leo Szilard Lectureship Award of the American Physical Society for "For applying physics to a variety of social problems and developing sustainable energy, environmental and public health technologies, as well as demonstrating how these could be scaled up, thus contributing to improved life for millions."
2015, Foreign fellow, Indian National Academy of Engineering (INAE) 
2014, Inducted in National Inventors Hall of Fame
2013, Prince Sultan bin Abdulaziz International Prize for Water—Creativity category—team award
2013, Inducted in the US National Academy of Engineering
2013, Laureate (Economic Development), The Tech Awards, Team award for the Berkeley-Darfur Stove 
2012, Lemelson-MIT Prize Award for Global Innovation
2012, Zayed Sustainability Prize Individual category
2011. European Inventor Award with Vikas Garud, European Patent Office, for UV water disinfection device
2009, The 15th Annual Heinz Award with special focus on the environment
2007, Breakthrough Award by Popular Mechanics—for Berkeley-Darfur Stove
2004. Laureate (Health), The Tech Awards, for UVWaterworks
2001, Fellow of the American Physical Society
1996, "Best of What's New" Award, Popular Science magazine, for UV Waterworks
1996, Discover Award, Discover magazine for UVWaterworks
1991, Pew Fellowship in Conservation and the Environment, The Pew Charitable Trusts

References

External links
Gadgil's Research Lab website
Personal Website
Courage: Ashok Gadgil. Short biography from MIT Press. Text adapted from Inventing Modern America.''
Prototype Online: Inventive Voices podcast featuring a two-part interview with Ashok Gadgil - From the Smithsonian's Lemelson Center for the Study of Invention and Innovation website.
Potential Energy Website

1950 births
Living people
Indian emigrants to the United States
UC Berkeley College of Engineering faculty
University of California, Berkeley alumni
Scientists from the San Francisco Bay Area
European Inventor Award winners
Articles with imported dually licensed text
20th-century American inventors
21st-century American inventors
American academics of Indian descent
Fellows of the American Physical Society
Annual Reviews (publisher) editors